Big Shoes (Italian: Scarpe grosse) is a 1940 Italian "white-telephones" comedy film directed by Dino Falconi and starring Amedeo Nazzari, Lilia Silvi and Elena Altieri. It is based on a play by Sándor Hunyady which had previously been turned into a 1939 Hungarian film Istvan Bors.

It was shot at the Palatino Studios in Rome. The film's sets were designed by the art directors Piero Filippone and Camillo Del Signore.

Cast
 Amedeo Nazzari as Stefano Di Marco 
 Lilia Silvi as Ninì 
 Elena Altieri as Marta 
 Enzo Biliotti as Il conte Carlo Garlandi 
 Tina Lattanzi as Sofia Garlandi 
 Lauro Gazzolo as Giancola 
 Olinto Cristina as Dossena, l'amministratore 
 Beatrice Mancini as Maria
 Emilio Petacci as Il notaio Sandelli 
 Oreste Fares as Il curato 
 Gualtiero De Angelis as Il procuratore Guzzini 
 Gorella Gori as Concetta, la cuoca 
 Franca Volpini as Annetta, la cameriera 
 Gastone Schirato as Michele, il maggiordomo 
 Oscar Andriani as Un braccianto 
 Fedele Gentile as L'altro braccianto 
 Alfredo Menichelli as Gastone

References

Bibliography 
 Piero Pruzzo & Enrico Lancia. Amedeo Nazzari. Gremese Editore, 1983.

External links 
 

1940 films
Italian comedy films
Italian black-and-white films
1940 comedy films
1940s Italian-language films
Films directed by Dino Falconi
Films shot at Palatino Studios
1940s Italian films